Safe Away is an album by Denison Witmer. It was self-released in 1998, and re-released on the Burnt Toast Vinyl label on January 16, 2002.

Track listing
 "Steven" - 2:28
 "Breathe in This Life" - 3:09
 "Over My Head" - 2:48
 "This and That" - 1:57
 "Closer to the Sun" - 3:15
 "What Will Stay?" - 2:17
 "Miles" - 2:26
 "Dain" - 3:47
 "Los Angeles" - 2:14
 "Around Everything" - 3:20
 "I Would Call You Now" -3:43
 "Sarah's Bridge" - 0:58
 "I Won't Leave" - 3:35

The re-release of Safe Away on Burnt Toast Vinyl includes three bonus tracks:
 "Broken" - 3:20
 "Say You'll Stick Around" - 4:46
 "Meant to Be" - 6:36

Personnel
 Denison Witmer - vocals, guitar
 Don Peris - producer, guitar

1998 albums
Denison Witmer albums